The Quest is an American fantasy-based competition series that aired on the network ABC that premiered on July 31, 2014, at 8:00 p.m. EST. Filmed on a castle estate outside Vienna, Austria, contestants face a variety of fantasy-themed challenges in the fictional land of "Everealm". The show ran for a single season, but a reboot was developed for Disney+, which premiered May 11, 2022.

Format
A number of people compete in a reality competition that takes place against the backdrop of a high fantasy setting, the kingdom of Everealm.  While the ongoing storyline is scripted and the contestants are interacting with actors throughout the competition, the actual challenges and eliminations are genuine and determined by the contestants' abilities and decisions.

In each episode, the contestants (called "Paladins") compete in a challenge related to events in the storyline.  The winning Paladin receives a "mark" of a virtue corresponding to the challenge; it is a medal that the Paladin wears, however, this medal doesn't save them from elimination. A predetermined number of losing Paladins are subjected to a subsequent challenge (the "Fates' Challenge"), and the winner of that challenge remains safe from elimination ("banishment").  The remaining Paladins, including the winner of the Fates' Challenge, decide which of the losing Paladins should be banished; the Paladins deliberate as a group and then each publicly stands behind the Paladin he or she wishes to save from banishment.  The Paladin with the least support is banished.

Location
The Quest was developed by a production team who had produced The Lord of the Rings trilogy, The Amazing Race and Queer Eye. The local service company was Gebhardt Service Productions.

The series was set in the Kingdom of Saenctum and was filmed on location in Austria, for the most part at Burg Kreuzenstein, just north of Vienna. Arie Bohrer of Location Austria of The National Film Commission of Austria, said that the location was very film-friendly and had a huge courtyard which lent itself to set construction. The castle was closed to the public for a month and the furniture was moved out and replaced with props. Location Austria grants funding subsidies for scripted film and television productions but The Quest was not eligible as reality shows are largely extemporary.

Plot
Everealm is a magical land of twelve peacefully coexisting kingdoms that is periodically menaced by a dark power.  Each time a threat to the realm appears, the three Fates summon “Paladins”, heroes from our world who are transported to Everealm.  Each receives one piece of a mystical weapon called the Sunspear.  The Paladins are constantly tested by the Fates under a processes that has them procedurally “banished”, one by one, until one single paladin remains.  The remaining paladin is designated as the “One True Hero”, and is destined to use the Sunspear to defeat the threat.

Each Paladin receives a scroll, proclaiming that he or she is a Paladin, beckoned to save Everealm from a menace known as Verlox.  The Paladins gather underground at a passageway between realities; there, the Fates explain the quest.  The Paladins are sent into Everealm to find the pieces of the Sunspear and to meet their guide, Crio, a follower of the Fates who is also Royal Steward of Castle Saenctum, the stronghold of the only kingdom still resisting Verlox.  The Paladins are welcomed by Queen Ralia XXIII and are trained by Sir Ansgar, who initially doubts the Paladins' worth but eventually comes to respect them.  However, the Grand Vizier seems hostile to the Paladins.

Paladins

Cast
 Peter Windhofer as Sir Ansgar, head of the Royal Army
 Jan Hutter as Crio the Dreamer, Royal Steward of Castle Saenctum
 Marcello de Nardo as the Grand Vizier, the Queen's Chief Advisor
 Susanne Gschwendtner as Queen Ralia XXIII, Protector of Saenctum
 Stephanie Buddenbrock as Karu, one of the three Fates
 Florence Kasumba as Talmuh, one of the three Fates
 Mai Duong Kieu as Solas, one of the three Fates
 Doug Tait as Verlox/Rana Chief

Uncredited Cast
 David Kaye as the Narrator
 Claudia Sabitzer as The Hag of Purgwal
 Lukas Johne as Herra
 Nicole Beutler as the Banshee

Episodes

Game summary

Sir Ansgar's challenge results

A bold placement indicates the Paladin who received the Mark, either by placing first or being chosen by and between the winning team
An italicized placement indicates the Paladin placed in the bottom group of Sir Ansgar's challenge and, as a result, faced the Fates' challenge

Fates' challenge and voting results

The vote was tied between Patrick and Lina. As holder of the Mark, Andrew was to break the tie; he chose to save Lina, banishing Patrick.

Legend:
 This Paladin won Sir Ansgar's challenge, earning the Mark and the sole vote in case of a tie
 This Paladin lost Sir Ansgar's challenge but won the Fates' challenge
 This Paladin lost both Sir Ansgar's and the Fates' challenge, but was saved from banishment
 This Paladin lost both Sir Ansgar's and the Fates' challenge, and was banished

Marks
These badges are pinned on a Paladin who achieves the best performance during each of Sir Ansgar's challenges, either by placing 1st or being selected by and between the winning team. Each Mark represents a different Kingdom and the values they represent.

Mark of Leadership (Kingdom of Saenctum) – Awarded to Bonnie by her team for being the "eyes" of the winning team during the scorpion challenge.
Mark of Dexterity (Kingdom of Lluas) – Awarded to Shondo for earning the most points during the horsemanship challenge.
Mark of Wisdom (Kingdom of Sanare) – Awarded to Andrew for completing the potion making challenge and saving the Queen.
Mark of Strategy (Kingdom of Kunnacht) – Awarded to Leticia for defeating Andrew and Shondo in the finals of the battle dome challenge.
Mark of Ingenuity (Kingdom of Austeer) – Awarded to Lina by her team for being the smallest member of the winning team in the barricade challenge.
Mark of Observation (Kingdom of Glic) – Awarded to Lina for being the first Paladin to return with a Fire Orb during the retrieval challenge.
Mark of Intelligence (Kingdom of Faisnay) – Awarded to Patrick by his team for both being the "eyes" and strategically rotating tasks during the flag signals challenge.
Mark of Bravery (Kingdom of Fortiteer) – Awarded to Andrew for being the first Paladin to reassemble his ratchet system and then use it to close one of the dragon's gates during the dragon trapping challenge.
Mark of Strength (Kingdom of Darvia) – Awarded to Andrew for being the first Paladin to break out of the Rana's cage.

Reception

Critical response 

Lily Sparks of Gawker praised the show saying, "The Quest is vicarious wish fulfillment, and one of its greatest joys is witnessing the sheer unadulterated happiness on the contestant's faces. I have never seen people enjoy their time on reality TV so much, ever, and I love it." Whoopi Goldberg of The View posted on Facebook, "I love this show!" Andy Dehnart of Reality Blurred compared the show favorably to its grand predecessor, Survivor, saying, "Watching Survivor for the first time was an experience that inspired awe, its high quality and rich storytelling creating a new world that drew from familiar elements. That's how The Quest feels, and it builds in a similar way, with the context and contestants continually offering epic surprises." Geoff Berkshire of Variety commended the show for taking a risk and setting itself apart from other reality television and called it "An epic adventure." The series made numerous "Must Watch" lists including Entertainment Weekly, The Wall Street Journal, Parade Magazine, The Los Angeles Times, The New York Post, The Huffington Post, TV Guide.

Accolades 
The series received a nomination for Outstanding Directorial Achievement in Reality Programs at the 2015 Directors Guild of America Awards.

Legacy 
A Facebook group, known as "The Quest Army" was created by founder David Patterson as a community for discussing episodes, narratives, and topics raised by the show. In addition, he also created an online petition at change.org, calling for a renewal of the show to Robert Mills of the American Broadcasting Company.

Reboot

Disney announced in January 2020 that a reboot of The Quest would be produced for its Disney+ streaming service, with van Munster and Doganieri as showrunners. van Munster had pitched the reboot to Disney after they had announced plans for the streaming service. The new version would have a similar type of narrative/reality game structure, but focus heavily on the scripted narrative, differing from the previous iteration. It would also feature primarily teenaged contestants, as van Munster stated the original show's broadcast had attracted a high teen demographic.
 The new version intended to film again at Burg Kreuzenstein but moved production to Castello di Amorosa in Napa Valley due to the COVID-19 pandemic. Production took place from January 2021 to March 2021.

On April 2, 2022, a trailer was released, announcing a May 11, 2022 premiere date.

References

External links
 

The Quest on tv.com

2010s American reality television series
American Broadcasting Company original programming
2014 American television series debuts
English-language television shows
2014 American television series endings
American fantasy television series
Television shows filmed in Austria
Television series set in fictional countries
American television series revived after cancellation
Television series by Disney–ABC Domestic Television